The Love Unleashed Tour is the eighth headlining concert tour by American recording artist, Martina McBride. The tour was launched in support of McBride's thirteenth studio album, Reckless. The tour played nearly 40 concerts in the United States and Canada.

Background
The tour was announced in August 2016. McBride was in the middle of wrapping up a summer festival outing, which would immediately lead into the tour. The singer was also the headlining act for "Band Against Cancer". The tour commences in October 2016 with High Valley, Hailey Whitters and Shelly Fairchild as the rotating opening acts. In December 2016, McBride announced the second leg of the tour, in conjunction with CMT's "Next Women of Country". The singer was joined by spring country artist Lauren Alaina, Post Monroe and Maggie Rose. The tour concluded in March 2017.

Speaking on the tour, McBride stated:"With so much tragedy and uncertainty in the world, our family is watching less news and spending more time listening to music, sharing stories over dinner and loving each other. I want this concert to be a place where people can share the common experience of music and how it can work its magic, as only music can."

Opening acts
Hailey Whitters 
High Valley 
Shelly Fairchild 
Lauren Alaina 
Post Monroe 
Maggie Rose

Setlist
The following setlist was performed on February 2, 2017, at the Peabody Opera House in St. Louis, Missouri. It does not represent all concerts for the duration of the tour. 
"Love's the Only House"
"My Baby Loves Me"
"Blessed"
"Valentine"
"Diamond"
"It Ain't Pretty"
"When God-Fearin' Women Get the Blues"
"Life #9"
"Safe in the Arms of Love
"I Love You"
"In My Daughter's Eyes"
"I'm Gonna Love You Through It"
"Anyway"
"Reckless"
"Help Me Make It Through the Night"
"(I Never Promised You A) Rose Garden
"This One's for the Girls"
"Wild Angels"
"Whatever You Say"
"A Broken Wing"
"Independence Day"
Encore
"All You Need Is Love"
"We'll Pick Up Where We Left Off"

Tour dates

Festivals and other miscellaneous performances
This concert was a part of "Band Against Cancer"

Box office score data

References

2016 concert tours
2017 concert tours
Martina McBride concert tours